In Greek mythology, Elara , Elare or Alera (Ancient Greek: Ἐλάρα, Ἐλάραη or Ἀλέρα), also called Larissa, was a mortal princess, the daughter of King Orchomenus and mother of the giant Tityos by Zeus. In some accounts, she was described as the daughter of Minyas instead.

Myth 
Zeus fell in love with Elara and hid her from his wife Hera's jealous rage by placing her deep beneath the Earth. This was where she gave birth to Tityos, a giant who is sometimes said to be the son of Gaia, the Earth goddess, for the reason being an earth-born (γηγενής gigenis "native") and brought up under the earth. It is further added that Elara died in labour because of the enormous size of her baby.

The cave through which Tityos was believed to have come to the surface of Earth was located on Euboea and referred to as Elarion.

Eponymy 
One moon of Jupiter is named Elara.

Notes

References 

 Apollodorus, The Library with an English Translation by Sir James George Frazer, F.B.A., F.R.S. in 2 Volumes, Cambridge, MA, Harvard University Press; London, William Heinemann Ltd. 1921. ISBN 0-674-99135-4. Online version at the Perseus Digital Library. Greek text available from the same website.
 Pseudo-Clement, Recognitions from Ante-Nicene Library Volume 8, translated by Smith, Rev. Thomas. T. & T. Clark, Edinburgh. 1867. Online version at theio.com
 Strabo, The Geography of Strabo. Edition by H.L. Jones. Cambridge, Mass.: Harvard University Press; London: William Heinemann, Ltd. 1924. Online version at the Perseus Digital Library.
 Strabo, Geographica edited by A. Meineke. Leipzig: Teubner. 1877. Greek text available at the Perseus Digital Library.

Princesses in Greek mythology
Mortal women of Zeus
Mortal parents of demigods in classical mythology
Minyan characters in Greek mythology